Slice is a line of fruit-flavored soft drinks originally manufactured by PepsiCo and introduced in 1984 (to replace the Teem brand) but discontinued by PepsiCo in North America in the late 2000s. Slice was reintroduced in the United States and Canada as a brand of organic juices by "New Slice Ventures LLC", which acquired the trademark rights in those countries. 

Slice was also reintroduced in India by PepsiCo in 2008 as a mango-flavoured fruit drink where it is currently advertised as Tropicana Slice.

History 
The original Lemon Lime Slice was introduced in 1984 as a replacement for Teem, and a competitor to Sprite and 7-Up.  Its distinguishing characteristic at the time was that it contained 10% fruit juice.   A diet version was introduced in 1985.   The line was expanded in 1986 with Mandarin Orange, Apple, and Cherry Cola flavors, including diet versions of each.   Advertisements during this era featured the slogan "We got the juice".

Slice was a big success upon release, inspiring other juice-infused drinks based on already existing juice brands, such as Coca-Cola's Minute Maid orange soda and Cadbury Schweppes's Sunkist.  By May 1987, Slice held 3.2 percent of the soft drink market.  One year later, it had fallen to 2.1 percent and was below 2 percent in June 1988.   By 1988, the juice content had been reduced (packaging now said "with fruit juices" instead of "10% fruit juices"), the slogan was changed to "Either you got it or you don't", and the Apple and Cherry Cola flavors had been discontinued.

By 1990, the packaging had been redesigned, and the juice content dropped entirely.  The line of flavors was also expanded again, this time with flavors more similar to competitors like Crush, including Strawberry, Pineapple, Fruit Punch, and Grape.   Slice advertising in the early 1990s featured Fido Dido, a character associated with US competitor 7-Up in international markets where PepsiCo has the rights to the latter brand.    Lemon Lime Slice used the slogan "Clearly the One" during this era. 

The first two can and bottle designs featured a solid color related to the flavor of the drink.  These were replaced in 1994 with black cans that featured colorful bursts related to the flavor of the drink, along with slicker graphics.  More new flavors were made available during this era, including Dr Slice, a competitor to Dr Pepper.   In 1997, the cans became blue with color-coordinated swirls.  The Mandarin Orange flavor was reformulated around this time as an "Orange Citrus" flavor with the new slogan, "It's orange, only twisted."   It would subsequently be reformulated again as just Orange Slice.

In the summer of 2000, lemon-lime Slice was replaced in most markets by Sierra Mist, which became a national brand in 2003.  The rest of the Slice line was replaced in most markets by Tropicana Twister Soda in the summer of 2005.

In early 2006, Pepsi resurrected the Slice name for a new line of diet soda called Slice ONE.  Marketed exclusively at Wal-Mart stores, Slice ONE was available in orange, grape and berry flavors, all sweetened with Splenda.

As of 2009, Slice (orange, diet orange, grape, strawberry and peach flavors) was available solely from Wal-Mart Stores.

Slice was launched in India in 1993 as a mango flavored drink and quickly went on to become a leading player in the category.  In India, 'Slice Mango' is promoted by Bollywood actress Katrina Kaif. Slice mango is also available in Pakistan.

Slice was discontinued by PepsiCo at an unknown date in the United States between the late 2000s to early or mid 2010s, no longer being on PepsiCo’s “Product Locator” website.

New Slice
By 2018, New Slice Ventures LLC had acquired the Slice trademark portfolio in the United States and Canada, and was working with Revolution Brands, Dormitus Brands and Spiral Sun Ventures, to re-launch a lower-sugar, lower-calorie beverage sweetened only with USDA-certified organic fruit juice.

In December 2018, New Slice Ventures announced that its new Slice-branded products had become available for wholesale pre-order in four flavors: Raspberry & Grapefruit, Blackberry, Mango & Pineapple and Apple & Cranberry.  In late 2022, New Slice Ventures re-branded the product in a "retro-style," and released four new flavors:  Orange, Lemon-Lime, Cherry and Berry. The product is available in a variety of retail stores, as well on on the brand's website.

Flavors 
Originally, the drink contained 10% fruit juice; the juice content was reduced by 1988 and eliminated by 1990.

Apple Slice (1986-88)
Diet Apple Slice
Cherry Cola Slice (1986-88, discontinued following the introduction of Wild Cherry Pepsi)
Diet Cherry Cola Slice
Cherry-Lime Slice
Dr Slice (pepper-flavored drink, 1990s)
Fruit punch Slice (1990s)
Grape Slice (1990s)
Lemon-lime Slice (original flavor) (1984-2000; replaced Teem in the United States, discontinued with introduction of Sierra Mist)
Diet Lemon-Lime Slice
Mandarin Orange Slice (1986-97)
 Diet Mandarin Orange Slice
 Orange Slice (1997, replaced Mandarin Orange in regular and diet)
 Orange Citrus Slice (late 1990s, replaced Orange in regular and diet, caffeine was also added)
Mango Slice (India and Pakistan)
Passionfruit Slice (1990s)
Peach Slice (1990s)
Pineapple Slice (1990s)
Pink Lemonade Slice (1990s)
Red Slice (1990s)
Strawberry Slice (1990s)

In 2022, New Slice Ventures listed four new flavors of natural soda as available on its website:

Orange Slice
Lemon Lime Slice
 Cherry Slice
 Berry Slice

References

External links 
  (U.S. and Canada), New Slice Ventures LLC
 Slice (Pakistan), PepsiCo
 Orange Slice commercial - A 1997 commercial marketing the reformulated Slice.
 Press Release- Press Release Announcing New Slice Products

PepsiCo soft drinks
Lemon-lime sodas
Citrus sodas
Products introduced in 1984
PepsiCo brands
Soft drinks
Products and services discontinued in 2009
Products introduced in 2018
Food and drink introduced in 1984